Tungusic peoples are an ethno-linguistic group formed by the speakers of Tungusic languages (or Manchu–Tungus languages). They are native to Siberia and Northeast Asia.

The Tungusic phylum is divided into two main branches, northern (Evenic or Tungus) and southern (Jurchen–Nanai). An intermediate group (Oroch–Udege) is sometimes recognized.

Name
The name Tungusic is artificial, and properly refers just to the postulated linguistic phylum (Tungusic languages). It is derived from Russian , a Russian exonym for the Evenks (Ewenki). English usage of Tungusic was introduced by Friedrich Max Müller in the 1850s, based on earlier use of German  by Heinrich Julius Klaproth. The alternative term Manchu–Tungus is also in use ( 'Tunguso-Manchurian').

The name Tunguska, a region of eastern Siberia bounded on the west by the Tunguska rivers and on the east by the Pacific Ocean, has its origin from the Tungus people (Evenks). Russian  was likely taken from East Turkic  (literally, 'wild pig, boar', from Old Turkic ), although some scholars prefer derivation from the Chinese word  ('Eastern Barbarians', cf.   'Tungusic'). This "chance similarity in modern pronunciation led to the once widely held assumption that the Eastern Hu were Tungusic in language. However, there is little basis for this theory."

History
It is generally suggested that the homeland of the Tungusic people is in northeastern Manchuria, somewhere near the Amur River region. The Tungusic language family is grouped mostly with Turkic and Mongolic, which forms the proposed linguistic area of the Altaic (or Micro-Altaic). Genetic evidence collected from the Ulchsky District suggests a date for the Micro-Altaic expansion predating 3500 BC.

The Tungusic expansion into Siberia displaced the indigenous Siberian languages, which are now grouped under the term Paleosiberian. Several theories suggest that the Pannonian Avars of the Avar Khaganate in Central, East  and Southeast Europe were of Tungusic origin or of partially Tungusic origin (as a ruling class).

Tungusic people on the Amur river like Udeghe, Ulchi and Nanai adopted Chinese influences in their religion and clothing with Chinese dragons on ceremonial robes, scroll and spiral bird and monster mask designs, Chinese New Year, using silk and cotton, iron cooking pots, and heated homes from China.

The Manchu originally came from Manchuria, which is now Northeast China and the Russian Far East. Following the Manchu establishment of the Qing dynasty in the 17th century, they have been almost completely assimilated into the language and culture of the ethnic Han population of China.

The southern Tungusic Manchu farming sedentary lifestyle was very different from the nomadic hunter gatherer forager lifestyle of their more northern Tungusic relatives like the Warka, which left the Qing state to attempt to make them sedentarize and farm like Manchus.

During the 17th century, the Tsardom of Russia was expanding east across Siberia, and into Tungusic-speaking lands, resulting in early border skirmishes with the Qing dynasty of China, leading up to the 1689 Treaty of Nerchinsk. The first published description of a Tungusic people to reach beyond Russia into the rest of Europe was by the Dutch traveler Isaac Massa in 1612. He passed along information from Russian reports after his stay in Moscow.

Ethnic groups

"Tungusic" (Manchu-Tungus) peoples are divided into two main branches: northern and southern.

The southern branch is dominated by the Manchu (historically Jurchen). The Chinese Qing emperors were Manchu, and the Manchu group has largely been sinicized (the Manchu language being moribund, with 20 native speakers reported as of 2007).

The Sibe were possibly a Tungusic-speaking section of the (Mongolic) Shiwei and have been conquered by the expanding Manchu (Jurchen). Their language is mutually intelligible with Manchu. The Nanai (Goldi) are also derived from the Jurchen. The Orok (Ulta) are an offshoot of the Nanai. Other minor groups closely related to the Nanai are the Ulch, Oroch and Udege. The Udege live in the Primorsky Krai and Khabarovsk Krai in the Russian Federation.

The northern branch is mostly formed by the closely related ethnic groups of Evenks (Ewenki) and Evens. (Evenks and Evens are also grouped as "Evenic". Their ethnonyms are only distinguished by a different suffix - -n for Even and -nkī for Evenkī; endonymically, they even use the same adjective for themselves - ǝwǝdī, meaning "Even" in the Even language and "Evenkī" in the Evenkī language.) The Evenks live in the Evenk Autonomous Okrug of Russia in addition to many parts of eastern Siberia, especially Sakha Republic. The Evens are very closely related to the Evenks by language and culture, and they likewise inhabit various parts of eastern Siberia. People who classify themselves as Evenks in the Russian census tend to live toward the west and toward the south of eastern Siberia, whereas people who classify themselves as Evens tend to live toward the east and toward the north of eastern Siberia, with some degree of overlap in the middle (notably, in certain parts of Sakha Republic). Minor ethnic groups also in the northern branch are the Negidals and the Oroqen. The Oroqen, Solon, and Khamnigan inhabit some parts of Heilongjiang Province, Inner Mongolia, and Mongolia and may be considered as subgroups of the Evenk ethnicity, though the Solons and the Khamnigans in particular have interacted closely with Mongolic peoples (Mongol, Daur, Buryat), and they are ethnographically quite distinct from the Evenks in Russia.

Demographics

Tungusic peoples are:

Population genetics

Paternal

The Tungusic people are closely related to other Northern Asian populations and to the Mongols. The main haplogroup of the Ewenic peoples (Evenks, Evens, Oroqens, and Negidals) is the C-M48 subclade (and especially its C-M86 subclade) of Haplogroup C-M217. Besides the Ewenic peoples, C-M86 is also common among Mongols (165/426 = 38.7% C-M77 in a sample of Kalmyks, 29/97 = 29.9% C-M86 in a sample of Mongols from northwest Mongolia, 27/149 = 18.1% C-M86 in a sample from Mongolia), Kazakhs (225/1294 = 17.39% C-M86, with Y-DNA belonging to this clade being observed in 58/76 = 76.3% of a sample of the Baiuly, 80/122 = 65.6% of a sample of the Alimuly, and 30/86 = 34.9% of a sample of the Jetyru, three tribes of western Kazakhstan who are collectively known as the Junior/Lesser/Kishi jüz or the Alshyns), and Ulchi (14/52 = 26.9%). Y-DNA haplogroup C is also the most common haplogroup among the Udege (12/20 = 60% C-M48, 14/21 = 66.7% C-RPS4Y711, 19/31 = 61.3% C3*(xC3c, C3d) plus 3/31 = 9.7% C3c), but the frequency among them of the C-M86 subclade is unclear.

Haplogroup N Y-DNA is also found among Ewenic peoples with varying frequency. Haplogroup N Y-DNA among Evenks in the basin of the Yenisei River and the Taimyr Peninsula most often belongs to the N-P43 subclade, which they share mainly with the Samoyedic and Ugric peoples of Western Siberia. Haplogroup N among Evenks, Evens, and Negidals in Eastern Siberia (the basin of the Lena River and parts to its south or east) belongs mainly to the N-Tat subclade, haplotypes of which they often share either with Yakut or with Buryat.

However, the modern Manchu people show relatively high amounts of Haplogroup O2, which is common among the Han Chinese. A study on the Manchu population of Liaoning reported that they have a close genetic relationship and significant admixture signal with northern Han Chinese. The Liaoning Manchu were formed from a major ancestral component related to Yellow River farmers and a minor ancestral component linked to ancient populations from Amur River Bain, or others. The Manchu were therefore an exception to the coherent genetic structure of Tungusic-speaking populations, likely due to the large-scale population migrations and genetic admixtures in the past few hundred years.

Maternal 

According to a total of 29 sample from the mtDNA studies of Xibo, Oroqen, and Hezhen from China:

283 samples from a mtDNA study of Tungusic Evenks, Evens, and Udeges in Russia published in 2013, their main mtDNA haplogroups are :

The Ewenic (Evenk and Even) people in Siberia appear similar to their North Siberian Turkic (Yakut and Dolgan) and Yukaghir neighbors in regard to their mitochondrial gene pool, exhibiting high frequencies of haplogroups C4a, C4b, C5, D4l2, and D5a2a2. D4l2 seems to be relatively common among Dolgans, Ewenic people, and Yukaghirs and less common among Yakut, whereas D5a2a2 seems to be relatively common among Evenks in the basin of the Iyengra River and the Yakut and less common among Evens, Yukaghirs, and Dolgans. C4a, C4b, and C5 seem to be spread relatively evenly among these populations. Evens, Evenks in the basin of the Nyukzha River, and Yukaghirs also share mtDNA haplogroup Z1a with notable frequency, but this haplogroup is rare among Evenks in many other areas as well as among Yakut and Dolgans.

The mitochondrial gene pool of the Udege appears to differ starkly from that of the Ewenic people. According to the same study by Duggan et al. (2013), the members of a sample of Udege belong to haplogroup N9b (10/31 = 32.3%, probably descended from Jomon people of northern Japan), haplogroup C4b1 (6/31 = 19.4%, also found among Evenks, Evens, Yakut, Dolgans, Buryat, Bargut, and Yukaghirs; three of the six Udege members of C4b1 belong to the C4b1f subclade marked by a T14153C mutation, which has only been observed in Udege to date), haplogroup M7a2a3 (5/31 = 16.1%, probably descended from Jomon people, but also observed among Evenks in the basin of the Nyukzha River and among Buryat), haplogroup M8a1b (4/31 = 12.9%, related to Japanese haplogroup M8a1a), haplogroup M9a1a1a2 (3/31 = 9.7%, this subclade also has been found in a Nivkh individual and belongs to a mainly Japanese but also Korean, Khamnigan, Kalmyk, Chinese, and Tibetan branch of the M9a1a1 clade, which is widespread in East Asia and notably frequent among present-day Tibetans), haplogroup Y1a (2/31 = 6.5%, shared mainly with the Hezhen, other Amur Tungusic/Nani peoples, and Nivkhs), and C4a1a4a (1/31 = 3.2%, also observed among Tibetans, Bargut, Buryat, Kyrgyz, Altai Kizhi, Teleut, Shor, Yakut, Evenks, and Evens).

The mitochondrial gene pool of the Ulchi, a Tungusic-speaking people who live in the lower basin of the Amur River, differs in detail both from the Ewenic peoples and from the Udege. According to Sukernik et al. (2012), the mitochondrial DNA of the present-day Ulchi population belongs predominantly to haplogroup Y1a (69/160 = 43.1%), which is shared with Nivkhs, Koryaks, Evens, and Mongolians and is estimated to have a time to most recent common ancestor of approximately 6,000 (95% CI 3,300 <-> 8,800) years before present on the basis of complete genomes or approximately 1,800 (95% CI 800 <-> 2,900) years before present on the basis of synonymous positions. Another 20% of the present-day Ulchi population belongs to mitochondrial DNA haplogroup D, which is significantly more diverse than their haplogroup Y1a mtDNA and can be resolved as follows: 12/160 = 7.5% D4o2, 4/160 = 2.5% D4h, 3/160 = 1.9% D4e4, 3/160 = 1.9% D4j, 2/160 = 1.25% D3, 2/160 = 1.25% D4c2, 1/160 = 0.6% D4a1, 1/160 = 0.6% D4b2b, 1/160 = 0.6% D4g2b, 1/160 = 0.6% D4m2, 1/160 = 0.6% D4o1, 1/160 = 0.6% D5a. Haplogroups C (20/160 = 12.5%, including 11/160 = 6.9% C5, 5/160 = 3.1% C4b, 3/160 = 1.9% C4a1, 1/160 = 0.6% C1a) and G (14/160 = 8.75%, including 12/160 = 7.5% G1b and 2/160 = 1.25% G2a1) are also well represented. The remainder of the Ulchi mitochondrial DNA pool comprises haplogroups N9b (7/160 = 4.4%), M8a (6/160 = 3.75%), F1a (5/160 = 3.1%), M7 (4/160 = 2.5%), M9a1 (1/160 = 0.6%), Z1a2(xZ1a2a) (1/160 = 0.6%), and B5b2 (1/160 = 0.6%). Besides a very high frequency of mtDNA haplogroup Y1a among the Ulchi, they also have a greater proportion of C5 than C4b or C4a, unlike the Udege, Evens, or Evenks. The haplogroup D mtDNA of the Ulchi is very diverse, but the most frequently observed subclade is D4o2, which Duggan et al. (2013) have observed only in their sample of Evens from Kamchatka among their samples of Tungusic peoples. The second most frequent subclade of haplogroup D among the Ulchi, D4h, was not observed among the Evenk, Even, or Udege samples of Duggan et al. (2013), but it has been observed in people from China, Japan, Thailand, the Philippines, and the Americas. Like the Udege, the Ulchi lack D4l2, the most frequently observed subclade of haplogroup D among Siberian Evenks and Evens, as well as haplogroup A. Haplogroup Z1a, which is very frequent in some samples of Evens and Evenks, has been observed only in the form of a rare basal Z1a2* in a single Ulchi individual. Small percentages of Evens and Evenks belong to haplogroup F1b, which is spread widely in Central Asia and northern East Asia, whereas a small percentage of Ulchis belongs to haplogroup F1a, this latter clade being found mainly in Southeast Asia, but also throughout China, Korea, and Japan.

The Human Genome Diversity Project (HGDP) included small samples of three Tungusic populations from the PRC in its panel: Xibo, Oroqen, and Hezhen. The Hezhen sample included ten individuals, whose mtDNA haplogroups are Y1a (4/10 = 40%), C5 (1/10 = 10%), C5d1 (1/10 = 10%), D4o2a1 (1/10 = 10%), B5b2a1b (1/10 = 10%), and F1d (1/10 = 10%). The Oroqen sample also included ten individuals, whose mtDNA haplogroups are D3 (4/10 = 40%), B4d (1/10 = 10%), C4a1 (1/10 = 10%), F1b1 (1/10 = 10%), F1c (1/10 = 10%), J1c10a1 (1/10 = 10%), and M11 (1/10 = 10%). The Xibo sample included nine individuals, whose mtDNA haplogroups are C5d1 (2/9 = 22.22%), C5a1 (1/9 = 11.11%), C4a1'5 (1/9 = 11.11%), D4b2 (1/9 = 11.11%), F1a1c (1/9 = 11.11%), R11b (1/9 = 11.11%), U4a2a1 (1/9 = 11.11%), and Z3a (1/9 = 11.11%).

The data seems to reflect some amount of gene flow with peoples living around the Sea of Okhotsk (Koryaks, Nivkhs, Ainus, etc.) on the one hand and peoples living in Central Asia (Turkic peoples, Mongols) on the other. A minor connection with Beringian populations (Chukotko-Kamchatkan, Eskimo-Aleut, Na-Dene) is apparent in the presence of mtDNA that belongs to haplogroup D2, haplogroup D3, and haplogroup A2a among present-day Northern Tungusic people.

Relation to Jōmon period population of Japan 
The existence of a second pre-Yayoi wave of immigration during the Jōmon period were suggested before. One study, published in the Cambridge University Press in 2020, suggests that the Jōmon people were rather heterogeneous, and that there was also an “Altaic-like” pre-Yayoi population (close to modern Tungusic-speakers, samplified by Oroqen) during Jōmon period Japan, which established itself over the local hunter gatherers. This “Altaic-like” population migrated from Northeast Asia into Japan in about 6000BC, before the actual Yayoi migration. Typically genetic lineages associated with Tungusic and Northeast Asian groups generally, were found at medium frequency in Jōmon period Japan. Analysed Jōmon samples show heterogeneity while being geographical close to each other which strongly suggests different ethnic origins for these samples.

Several historians noted striking similarities between the horse riding nomads of the Amur region, specifically Tungusic peoples, and the Emishi. It is suggested that the Emishi originated from an original Tungusic source population, which later assimilated Japonic-speaking Izumo migrants. The Esan culture of northern Honshu is associated with this population and later gave rise to the Satsumon culture which played an important role in the formation of modern Ainu people of Hokkaido. The Emishi were horse riders and iron workers (unlike the Ainu). While there is evidence for some agriculture (millet and rice), they were mostly horse riders, hunters, fishers and traders. Oishi Naomasa, Emuri Susumi, and others link the Emishi to the semi-nomadic Malgal/Mohe people. There was also a distinction between contemporary Honshu Emishi and Watarishima Emishi of Hokkaido. Historical evidence suggests frequently fights between Honshu Emishi and Watarishima Emishi. It is argued that the Watarishima Emishi consisted of Honshu Emishi and proto-Ainu-speakers. Kudo Masaki and Kitakamae Yasuo concluded that the Emishi were of predominantly Tungusic origin with some assimilated Japonic groups (Izumo people). They further argue that linguistic place names (toponyms) previously suggested to be Ainu, can be explained by Amur Tungusic substratum onto proto-Ainu. Kudo also suggests that the Matagi hunters are in fact descendants of the Emishi, with the specific hunting vocabulary to be of Tungusic rather than Ainu origin.

Gallery

See also
Eskeri
Xeglun
Sinicization of the Manchus

References
Mile Nedeljković, Leksikon naroda sveta, Beograd, 2001.

External links
 Manchu Tungusic people of China

 
Ethnic groups in China
Ethnic groups in Russia